The athletics competition in the 1946 Central American and Caribbean Games were held in Barranquilla, Colombia.

Medal summary

Men's events

Women's events

Medal table

References

 
 
 

Athletics at the Central American and Caribbean Games
Central American and Caribbean Games
International athletics competitions hosted by Colombia
1946 Central American and Caribbean Games